Darlawn is a census town in Aizawl district  in the  state of Mizoram, India.

Geography
It has an average elevation of 870 metres (2854 feet).

Demographics
 India census, Darlawn had a population of 3859. Males constitute 51% of the population and females 49%. Darlawn has an average literacy rate of 83%, higher than the national average of 59.5%: male literacy is 83% and, female literacy is 82%. In Darlawn, 13% of the population is under 6 years of age.

References

Aizawl
Cities and towns in Aizawl district